Bothriochloa is a common and widespread genus of plants in the grass family native to many countries on all inhabited continents and many islands. They are often called beardgrass, bluegrass or bluestem.

Shahid Nawaz, an agrostologist at the Blatter Herbarium, collected an interesting specimens of Bothriochloa from Gooty Fort Hill, Andhra Pradesh, India in December 2019. The specimens were identified and confirmed as Bothriochloa ewartiana (Domin) C. E. Hubb. based on literature study and international correspondence with experts from Australia, Indonesia and Americas. This study adds an extended and disjunct distribution of a Far Eastern species in Asia from India.

Systematics

Species list 
The following species are recognised:
 Bothriochloa alta (Hitchc.) Henrard – tall beardgrass – Americas from New Mexico to Argentina
 Bothriochloa barbinodis (Lag.) Herter– cane bluestem – USA (CO MO OK AZ CA NV UT TX NM FL SC), Mexico, El Salvador, South America (from Colombia to Paraguay)
 Bothriochloa biloba S.T.Blake – Queensland, New South Wales
 Bothriochloa bladhii (Retz.) S.T.Blake – Asia (Yemen to Caucasus to Japan to Maluku), Australia, New Guinea, Africa, Madagascar
 Bothriochloa bunyensis B.K.Simon – Queensland
 Bothriochloa campii (Swallen) De Wet – Ecuador
 Bothriochloa compressa (Hook.f.) Henrard – India, Lesser Sunda Islands
 Bothriochloa decipiens (Hack.) C.E.Hubb. – Australia
 Bothriochloa edwardsiana (Gould) Parodi – Mexico, Texas, Argentina, Uruguay
 Bothriochloa ensiformis (Hook.f.) Henrard – India
 Bothriochloa erianthoides (F.Muell.) C.E.Hubb. – Queensland, New South Wales
 Bothriochloa eurylemma M.Marchi & Longhi – Wagner – Brazil (Mato Grosso do Sul), Argentina (Entre Ríos, Chaco, Formosa, Tucumán, Salta)
 Bothriochloa ewartiana (Domin) C.E.Hubb. – Australia, Philippines, Lesser Sunda Islands, Andhra Pradesh, India 
 Bothriochloa exaristata (Nash) Henrard – awnless beardgrass – southern Brazil, northern Argentina, Paraguay, Bolivia, Peru, USA (TX LA)
 Bothriochloa grahamii (Haines) Bor – India
 Bothriochloa hirtifolia (J.Presl) Henrard – Mexico, Guatemala
 Bothriochloa hybrida (Gould) Gould – USA (TX LA), Mexico (from Chihuahua to Oaxaca)
 Bothriochloa imperatoides (Lillo) Herter – Rio Grande do Sul, northern Argentina, Uruguay
 Bothriochloa insculpta (Hochst. ex A.Rich.) A.Camus – sweetpitted grass – Africa, Madagascar, India, Arabian Peninsula, Spain, Sicily
 Bothriochloa ischaemum (L.) Keng – yellow bluestem – Eurasia + North Africa from Portugal + Canary Islands to Korea
 Bothriochloa kuntzeana (Hack.) Henrard – India, Nepal
 Bothriochloa laguroides (DC.) Herter – silver bluestem – Americas from Mexico to Chile
 Bothriochloa longifolia (Hack.) Bor – India
 Bothriochloa longipaniculata (Gould) Allred & Gould – longspike beardgrass – Brazil (Mato Grosso do Sul, Rio de Janeiro, Rio Grande do Sul, Santa Catarina), Argentina (Corrientes, Chaco, Formosa, Misiones), Paraguay, Guatemala, Mexico, USA (TX LA MS)
 Bothriochloa macra (Steud.) S.T.Blake – red – leg grass, red grass, redleg or pitted beard grass – Australia
 Bothriochloa meridionalis M.Marchi & Longhi – Wagner – Venezuela, Colombia, Ecuador, Rio Grande do Sul
 Bothriochloa modesta (Backer) Backer & Henrard – Java, Lesser Sunda Islands
 Bothriochloa pertusa (L.) A.Camus – pitted beardgrass – China, India, Southeast Asia, Australia, islands of Indian Ocean + western Pacific
 Bothriochloa pseudischaemum (Nees ex Steud.) Henrard – India, Sri Lanka
 Bothriochloa radicans (Lehm.) A.Camus – eastern + southern Africa, Arabian Peninsula
 Bothriochloa saccharoides Rydb. – Americas from Utah to Uruguay
 Bothriochloa springfieldii (Gould) Parodi – USA (CO AZ UT TX NM LA), Mexico, Bolivia, Argentina
 Bothriochloa torreyana  (Steud.) Scrivanti & Anton – southern USA (from CA to SC), Mexico, Central America, Brazil, Argentina, Uruguay
 Bothriochloa velutina M.Marchi & Longhi – Wagner – Paraná, Santa Catarina
 Bothriochloa woodrovii (Hook.f.) A.Camus – India
 Bothriochloa wrightii (Hack.) Henrard – Mexico, USA (TX NM AZ)

Former taxa 
See Capillipedium, Dichanthium, Euclasta, Hemisorghum and Pseudosorghum.

The following taxa were formerly included in the genus:

See also
 List of Poaceae genera

References

 
Poaceae genera
Taxonomy articles created by Polbot
Andropogoneae